Ethna is a feminine Irish given name.

Notable people with the name include:
Ethna Byrne-Costigan (1904–1991), Irish academic and writer
Ethna Carbery (1864–1902), Irish journalist, writer and poet
Ethna Gaffney (1920-2011), Irish professor and scientist
Ethna MacCarthy (1903–1959), Irish poet and paediatrician
Ethna Rouse (born 1937), former New Zealand cricketer

Irish-language feminine given names